The 2003 elections to Argyll and Bute Council were held on the 1 May 2003 and were the third for the unitary authority, which was created under the Local Government etc (Scotland) Act 1994 and replaced the previous two-tier system of local government under Strathclyde Regional Council and Dumbarton and Argyll & Bute District Councils. It was held on the same day as the second Scottish Parliament election and resulted in no change to the administration of the council - independent control. These were the last elections to the council using the first past the post electoral system.

Election results

Ward results

References

External links

2003 Scottish local elections
2003